The 2011 Penrith Panthers season is the 45th in the club's history. They are competing in the NRL's 2011 Telstra Premiership. This year saw Phil Gould appointed as the Penrith Panthers' new football operations manager.

2011 Players and Coaching staff
 = Injured
 (SE) – Season Ending Injury 

 (GK)  (SE)

 (GK) 
 (GK)

 (GK)

 (SE)

(SE) 

Source:

Panthers Group CEO: Glenn Matthews
Rugby League CEO: Unknown
Head coach: Steve Georgallis
Rugby League Marketing Manager: Shannon Donato
Media Manager: Andrew Farrell
Coaching, Development and Recruitment Manager: Jim Jones
Stadium Operations Manager: Tamara Van Antwerpen

Transfers

Gains

Losses

Jersey and Sponsors

In 2011 the Panthers jerseys were again made by ISC. They retained their predominantly black home jerseys from 2010, but instead only was near fully black (Faint claw marks on either sides) with only teal on the collar and sleeves. The teal jersey of last year was to be used as the away jersey again, but was dumped in Round 4, for a white jersey with teal and black stripes and the same claw marks from the home jersey. The heritage jersey used was from their 1991 jersey. The "Pink Panthers" jersey used was based on the new away jersey, except absolutely everything on the jersey was made of different shades of pink.

Sanyo were again the major sponsor of the Panthers in 2011. Titan Warehousing Solutions were dropped as the sleeve sponsor with the club opting to go with no sponsor at all, until 17 April, when the club announced that Onsite Cleaning would be the 2011 sleeve sponsor.

Fixtures 
The Panthers again used Centrebet Stadium as their home ground in 2011, their home ground since they entered the competition in 1967.

Pre-season

Regular season 

Notes

Milestones and achievements
 Round 2 – (18 March): the Panthers notched up their first win of the season
 Round 5 – (7 April): against the Canberra Raiders, Winger David Simmons would bag the first hat trick of the season for the Panthers. In the same round, Sarafu Fatiaki made his debut for the club.
 Round 6 – (17 April): Timana Tahu would score his first try for the club since signing with the Panthers in Round 6
 Round 7 – (22 April): the board decided that they club would part ways with coach Matthew Elliott at the end of the season after a poor start to the season which sees them in 14th
 Round 8 – (1 May): Nafe Seluini scored his first try for the Panthers against his former team, the New Zealand Warriors. In the same match, new recruit Yileen Gordon would make his debut for the club as well as Trent Waterhouse scoring 150 career points. The match also saw Michael Gordon and Travis Burns notch up 100 career matches, all of Michael Gordon's coming with the Panthers
 Round 10 – (12–17 May) Phil Gould signed on as Coaching Manager for next season. Dayne Weston made his debut for the club off the bench. The match was also the first Drop Goal scored by the club this season. It was confirmed on the 14th, the day after the match, that fullback Michael Gordon had ruptured his Anterior Cruciate Ligament and will miss the rest of the season. It was announced by FoxSports that new recruit Timana Tahu had ruptured his Pectoral Muscle and would be out for the rest of the season
Round 11 – (19–22 May) It was announced by both the NRL and Newcastle Knights that injured player Timana Tahu will link up next season with the Knights for 2 seasons. Lachlan Coote made his return from Osteitis pubis, marking the return with a try. Prior to the match during warm up, Travis Burns would have to withdraw after the team doctor gave him a pain injection, accidentally hitting the nerve causing Burn's leg to go numb.
Round 12 – (23–30 May) Round 12 couldn't have got off to a worse start with CEO Mick Leary would resign from his position effective immediately.
Round 13 – (4 June) Michael Jennings would play his 100th game in a bitter sweet win against Gold Coast Titans. Although it was a milestone in games, he would hobble off in the 60th minute after getting his leg stuck under a Titans player. He was ruled out for 4 weeks and missed Origin II and Origin III
Round 15 – (20 June) Matthew Elliott stepped down as Coach for the rest of the season, Steve Georgallis was named caretaker coach for the rest of the season. Daine Laurie was also released midweek due to behaviour. New signing Arana Taumata was also investigated by police after using a script pad he stole from the club doctor. Star centre Michael Jennings was also fined $10,000 for drinking whilst being injured
Round 15 – (20 June) Steve Georgallis would coach his first match as head coach in NRL by beating the North Queensland Cowboys 30–20 on a day that would see a new maximum crowd for the season of 14,090. The game would also mark the 100th game for Adrian Purtell.
Round 16 – (2 July) Steve Georgallis would notch up his second win in as many games as the Panthers beat the Bulldogs 20–6. It was announced earlier in the week that Trent Waterhouse would leave the club for a 3-year deal at Warrington Wolves in the Super League. It was also announced during the week that Ivan Cleary would take the head coach role with the club from next season.
Round 21 – (26 July) Petero Civoniceva would announce his return to the Brisbane Broncos in 2012, citing it was for his family. The Panthers would grant him a release with 1 year left on his contract.

Ladder

References

External links
Panthers official site

Penrith Panthers seasons
Penrith Panthers season